The Shri Jagannath Puri Temple is a provincial heritage site in Inanda (eThekwini Metropolitan Municipality) in the KwaZulu-Natal province of South Africa.

In 1979, it was described in the Government Gazette as

References
 South African Heritage Resource Agency database

Hindu temples in South Africa
Temples dedicated to Jagannath
Religious buildings and structures in South Africa
Buildings and structures in KwaZulu-Natal
eThekwini Metropolitan Municipality